Stehli is a surname. Notable people with the surname include:

Edgar Stehli (1884–1973), American actor
Jemima Stehli (born 1961), British artist
Robert Stehli (1930–2018), Swiss conductor

See also
Stehlin

German-language surnames